Locksley station is a disused railroad station in Thornbury Township, Delaware County, Pennsylvania. It previously served the Pennsylvania Railroad (PRR) and later SEPTA Regional Rail's R3 West Chester Line. SEPTA closed the station in 1986. In 1997, this portion of the line was reopened by the West Chester Railroad heritage railway for weekend excursions; the company restored the Locksley station building.

History
Pennsylvania Railroad established Locksley station on May 24, 1890, based on a petition from the residents of the locality. The name, according to a 1901 newspaper article, did not originate from the area, but was chosen by the superintendent of that division of the railroad from a volume of poems by Alfred, Lord Tennyson.

SEPTA later took over the station as part of the R3 West Chester Line. SEPTA discontinued regular passenger service in September 1986, due to deteriorating track conditions and Chester County's desire to expand facilities at Exton station on SEPTA's Paoli/Thorndale Line. Service was restored by the West Chester Railroad (WCRR) in 1997, a privately owned and operated heritage railway that operates between Glen Mills and West Chester on weekends. A PRR historic manual block position-light signal stands near the station site. Remains of the Dyer Stone Quarry and Thorndale Mills are also visible from the station.

References

External links
West Chester Railroad's official website
Existing Railroad Stations in Delaware County, Pennsylvania

Railway stations closed in 1981
Former SEPTA Regional Rail stations
Former Pennsylvania Railroad stations
Former railway stations in Delaware County, Pennsylvania

Railway stations in the United States opened in 1891
Railway stations in the United States opened in 1997